= Van Creek =

Stream in Georgia, USA

Coordinates: 34°8′35.40″N 82°42′33.48″W

Van Creek is a stream in the U.S. state of Georgia. It is a tributary to the Savannah River.

A variant name is "Vans Creek". Van Creek took its name from Van's Church, which in turn was named after David Van, a pioneer citizen.
